Milan Vukelić (Serbian Cyrillic: Милан Вукелић; 2 January 1936 – 4 September 2012) was a Serbian footballer.

Honours
Partizan
 Yugoslav First League: 1960–61, 1961–62, 1962–63, 1964–65

References

External links
 Milan Vukelić at reprezentacija.rs 

1936 births
2012 deaths
Footballers from Novi Sad
Yugoslav footballers
Serbian footballers
Yugoslavia international footballers
Association football midfielders
Yugoslav First League players
FK Vojvodina players
FK Partizan players
FK Partizan non-playing staff